Else Marie Høst, née Røysland (11 March 1908–August 1, 1996) was a Norwegian literary historian and author.

Else Marie Røysland  was born in Stavanger, Norway. She was the daughter of Iver Johan Røysland (1870) and Gustava Aldén (1875-1932). In 1931 she married philologist Gunnar Høst (1900–1983), and became a daughter-in-law of Sigurd Høst.

After a period of study in Sweden in 1930 and at the Swedish Institute in Rome during 1931, she attended the University of Oslo. She took her mag.art. degree in 1941 and  dr.philos. degree in 1959 on the basis of her thesis Hedda Gabler. En monografi  about Ibsen's Hedda Gabler.  She later wrote  Vildanden av Henrik Ibsen (1967), a book about Ibsen's The Wild Duck.  She also published several textbooks. In 1970 and 1971 she co-released Fransk lesning I and Fransk lesning II together with her husband.

References

1908 births
1996 deaths
University of Oslo alumni
People from Stavanger
Norwegian philologists
Women philologists
Norwegian literary historians
Henrik Ibsen researchers
20th-century Norwegian dramatists and playwrights
20th-century Norwegian women writers
Women literary historians
Norwegian women historians
Norwegian women dramatists and playwrights
20th-century philologists